Freemansundet is the sound separating Barentsøya, to the north, from Edgeøya, in the Svalbard archipelago, Norway.

Background
The straight is named after Alderman Ralph Freeman, who was involved in the English whaling trade in the early 17th century. The polar bear, Ursus maritimus, is a seasonal visitor to the Freemansundet; this species has a genetically distinct deme within the Barents Sea region.

Gallery

References

External links
Norwegian Polar Institute Place names in Norwegian polar areas

Straits of Svalbard
Edgeøya
Barentsøya